Warming Up is a 1985 Australian film directed by Bruce Best and starring Henri Szeps, Barbara Stephens, Adam Fernance, and Queenie Ashton. The screenplay concerns a divorced woman who moves to a country town and teaches the local football team to dance ballet. Shot in 1984 and originally intended as a tele-movie, it was made by the team responsible for the TV show A Country Practice.

Distribution
The film has been broadcast five times on BBC TV - in December 1985, January 1989, April 1991, January 1995 and August 1998.

References

External links

Australian comedy films
1985 films
1980s English-language films
1980s Australian films